Jean-Pierre Corval (born 16 January 1949) is a French hurdler. He competed in the men's 110 metres hurdles at the 1976 Summer Olympics.

References

External links
 

1949 births
Living people
Athletes (track and field) at the 1972 Summer Olympics
Athletes (track and field) at the 1976 Summer Olympics
French male hurdlers
Olympic athletes of France
Sportspeople from Yvelines